Evangel College is a co-educational school in Hong Kong, located at 7 Chi Shin Street, Tseung Kwan O, New Territories. Founded in 2006, the school's mission is to "Proclaim the Truth, Nurture our Youth". The school commenced operation in the Direct Subsidy Scheme since its foundation. It uses English as the medium of instruction.

School facilities 
Adopting orange and white as its fundamental colour, the Z-shaped school campus is mainly divided into the Primary and Secondary Sections, connected on the first, second and fourth floors. The campus design is a winning work of "In Search of Diversity in School Design: Architectural Design Competition" held by Education Bureau and is original from its 3 designers, co-operating with the school's activity approach on teaching and making good use of space.

EFCC Evangel College Wendell Memorial Church was founded in 2008 as a gospel partner of the school, serving the school itself and the nearby neighbourhood.

The school plans to build a new education complex at a site near the school's car park, covering an area of about 20,000 sq. feet and providing a gross floor area of 100,000 sq. feet. The estimated cost for the new complex is HK$4.6 billion, and will end its construction in 2023. As the fundraising process is not as ideal, the construction work has not yet begin until now.

Facilities in the school campus are distributed as follows (Classrooms are on the second to fifth floors):

Subjects

Secondary One to Two 
Chinese Language, English Language, Mathematics, Humanities (includes Economics, Geography and History), Chinese History, Integrated Science (includes Physics, Chemistry and Biology), Physical Education, Christian Education, Music, Visual Arts

Secondary Three 
Chinese Language, English Language, Mathematics, Economics, Geography, History, Chinese History, Physics, Chemistry, Biology, Physical Education, Christian Education, Music, Visual Arts

Secondary Four to Six (NSS) 
Core subjects: Chinese Language, English Language, Mathematics, Liberal Studies, Physical Education, Christian Education

First elective: Chinese History (A), Economics (B), Geography (C), Chemistry (D&E)

Second elective: History/Business, Accounting and Financial Studies/Mathematics (Extended Part 1)/Chinese Literature/English Literature (A-C), Biology (D), Physics (E)

Third elective: /English Literature/Economics/Geography/Biology/Physics/Business, Accounting and Financial Studies/Information and Communication Technology/Visual Arts

Fourth elective: Mathematics (Extended Part 1) (A-E), Mathematics (Extended Part 2) (A-E)

Remarks: It is not a must for students to attempt a fourth elective. Students have to attend after-school trial lessons and meet certain requirements before taking any of the fourth electives.

House 
House are defined by the student's class in primary and junior secondary forms, while senior secondary students follow their house as when they were in junior secondary forms.

 Allamanda

 Bauhinia

 Carnation

 Daffodil

 Edelweiss

Environmentally friendly policies 
The campus itself is an environmentally friendly design. The school also sets up Environmental Protection Team, regularly holding activities and raise awareness on environmental issues, for example: recycling moon-cake boxes and red envelopes, visiting Jone’s Cove and Mai Po, etc.

Student Union
Established in 2018, the Student Union is a democratically elected body by the student population at the end of each calendar year. Their main function is to organise events throughout the year for students to participate in. The Student Union is composed of four main posts, the President, Vice-President, Secretary and Treasurer. Alongside, there is a body of committee members to help deliver events that the Student Union has planned.

Principals, vice-principals and deputy vice-principals

Ranks and  banding 
As of 2021-2022, Evangel College has an estimated banding of Band 1B and key relevant rankings are as follows:

References

External links 

Tseung Kwan O
Protestant secondary schools in Hong Kong
Evangelical Free Church of China